Carroll is an English unisex given name and a surname (Carroll). As an English given name, it is a form of Charles and Caroline. Notable people known by this name include the following:

Given name

Carroll Edward Adams (1923–1970), American brigadier general
Carroll Alley (1927–2016), American physicist
Carroll Arnett, baptismal name of Gogisgi, Cherokee poet
Carroll Baker (born 1931), American actress
Carroll Baker (singer) (born 1949), Canadian singer/songwriter
Carroll Ballard (born 1937), American film director
Carroll L. Beedy (1880–1947), American politician
Carroll Beringer (1928–2011), American baseball player and coach
Carroll Thayer Berry (1886–1978), American artist
Carroll Bierman (1918–1970), American horse racing jockey
Carroll Bloom (born 1928), Canadian gridiron football player
Carroll Parrott Blue (1943–2019), African-American filmmaker, director and author
Carroll C. Boggs (1844–1923), American jurist
Carroll Bond (1873–1943), American jurist
Carroll Borland (1914–1994), American actress
Carroll Broussard, American basketball player
Carroll Burling (born 1934), American politician
Carroll A. Campbell Jr. (1940–2005), American politician
Carroll Carstairs (1888–1948), American art dealer and British army officer
Carroll Chaplin (1882–1953), American politician
Carroll Chase (1878–1960), American philatelist
Carroll Clark (1894–1968), American art director
Carroll Cloar (1913–1993), American painter
Carroll Coates (born 1929), American songwriter, composer, and lyricist
Carroll L. Coburn (1907–1975), American politician
Carroll Cole (1938–1985), American serial killer
Carroll Cook (1855–1915), American judge
Carroll Cooney (1887–1947), American gridiron football and squash player, hammer throw athlete, and businessman
Carroll Cutler (1829– 1894), American academic administrator
Carroll Dale (born 1938), American gridiron football player
Carroll John Daly (1889–1958), American writer
Carroll C. Davis, American chemist
Carroll Dawson, American assistant coach and general manager
Carroll Dickerson (1895–1957), American jazz violinist and bandleader
Carroll William Dodge (1895–1988), American mycologist and lichenologist
Carroll Thomas Dozier (1911—1985), American prelate
Carroll A. Edson (1891–1986), American scouting pioneer
Carroll Lane Fenton (1900–1969), American geologist, paleontologist, neoichnologist, and historian of science
Carroll Freeman, American operatic tenor, opera director, and music educator
Carroll Gartin (1913–1966), American politician
Carroll Gibbons (1903–1954), American-born pianist, bandleader and popular composer
Carroll Gibson (born 1945), American politician
Carroll Glenn (1918–1983), American violinist
Carroll Haff (1892–1947), American track and field athlete
Carroll C. Halterman (1919–2005), American management development authority
Carroll Hardy (born 1933), American baseball player
Carroll C. Hincks (1889–1964), American judge
Carroll Hollensworth (1900–1959), American politician
Carroll Hooser (born 1944), American basketball player
Carroll Hubbard (born 1937), American politician
Carroll Huntress (1924–2015), American football coach
Carroll Izard (1923–2017), American research psychologist
Carroll N. Jones III (1944–2017), American artist
Carroll D. Kearns (1900–1976), American politician
Carroll Kendall (1890–1975), Canadian ice hockey player 
Carroll F. King (1924-2010), American businessman and politician
Carroll N. Kirk, American gridiron football player and college sports coach
Carroll Knicely (c. 1929–2006), American editor and publisher
Carroll Leavell (born 1936), American politician
Carroll LeTellier (born 1928), US Army Major General
Carroll Levis (1910–1968), Canadian radio personality
Carroll Martin (1914–1985), American gridiron football executive
Carroll W. McColpin (1914–2003). American Air Force officer 
Carroll McComas (1886–1962), American stage, film, and television actress
Carroll McCray (born 1962), American gridiron football coach
Carroll Meins (1892–1953), American politician
Carroll Metzner (1919–2008), American politician
Carroll Moran (born 1945), Irish judge
Carroll Morgan (boxer) (1947–2018), Canadian boxer
Carroll Morgan (computer scientist) (born 1952), American computer scientist
Carroll Vincent Newsom (1904–1990), American educator 
Carroll Nye (1901–1974), American film actor
Carroll O'Connor (1924–2001), American actor, producer, and director
Carroll D. Osburn, American theologian
Carroll S. Page (1843–1925), American businessman and politician
Carroll Phillips (born 1992), American football
Carroll Pickett (born 1933), American minister 
Carroll Pratt (1921–2010), American sound engineer
Carroll C. Pratt (1894–1979), American psychologist and musicologist
Carroll Quigley (1910–1977), American historian and theorist
Carroll Righter (1900–1988), American astrologer
Carroll Roberson (born 1955), American evangelist, gospel singer-songwriter, and author
Carroll Rosenbloom (1907–1979), American businessman
Carroll Seghers II (1924–2004), American photographer
Carroll Sembera (1941–2005), American baseball player
Carroll Seron American sociologist
Carroll Sheehan, American real estate executive and political figure
Carroll Shelby (1923–2012), American automotive designer, racing driver, entrepreneur, and author
Carroll H. Shilling (1885–1950). American jockey
Carroll Eugene Simcox (1912–2002), American priest
Carroll Smith (1932–2003), American race car driver, engineer, and author
Carroll Smith-Rosenberg, scholar of women's history, gender studies, and sexuality
Carroll Sockwell (1943–1992), American abstract artist
Carroll O. Switzer (1908–1960), American judge
Carroll Thompson (born 1960), British singer
Carroll Waller (1927–2014), American preservationist, writer and political official
Carroll Van West, American historian
Carroll Livingston Wainwright I (1899–1967), American artist
Carroll Snow Wales (1917–2007), art restorer and conservator
Carroll S. Walsh Jr. (1921–2012), American jurist
Carroll Widdoes (1903–1971), American gridiron football coach and college athletics administrator
Carroll Williams (1916—1991), American zoologist
Carroll Williams (Canadian football) (fl. 1963 –1969) American gridiron football player
Carroll L. Wilson (1910–1983), American professor of management and technology
Carroll D. Wood, American judge
Carroll D. Wright (1840–1909), American statistician
Carroll Yerkes (1903–1950), American baseball player

Nickname
Carroll Carroll, professional name of Carroll S. Weinschenk, (1902–1991), American writer
Carroll Burleigh Colby, full name of C. B. Colby (1904–1977), American writer
Carroll Malone, pseudonym of William B. McBurney (??–1892), Irish poet
Carroll Mather Capps, who used the pseudonym C. C. MacApp, (1917–1971), American science fiction author
Carroll Ray Mothell, known as Dink Mothell, (1897–1980), American Negro leagues baseball player
Carroll Watson Rankin pen name of Caroline Clement Watson Rankin, (1864–1945), American author
Julian Alvin Carroll Chandler, full name of J. A. C. Chandler, (1872–1934), American historian, author and educator

Middle name

Othilia Carroll Beals (1875—1970) American lawyer and judge
James Carroll Beckwith (1852–1917), American painter
Abner Carroll Binder (1896–1956), American journalist
F. Carroll Brewster (1825–1898), American lawyer and judge
Charles Carroll Colby (1827–1907), Canadian politician
Jo-Carroll Dennison (born 1923), Miss America 1942
Daniel Carroll Digges (??–1860), American politician
Lewis Carroll Epstein, American physics author
Charles Carroll Everett (1829–1900), American divine and philosopher
Ann Carroll Fitzhugh (1805–1875), American abolitionist
Hugh Carroll Frazer (1891–1975), American Naval officer
Charles Carroll Glover Jr. (1888–1976), American banker and philanthropist
Lillie Mae Carroll Jackson (1889–1975), American civil rights activist
Robert Carroll Johnson Jr. (1938–2014), American Bishop
John Carroll LeGrand (1814–1861), American politician and jurist
John Carroll Lynch (born 1963), American actor and film director
Alexander Carroll Maingay (1836–1869), British physician and botanist
C. Carroll Marsh (1829–?), American Army officer 
J. Carroll McCormick (1907–1996), American prelate
Ronald Carroll McDonald (1926–2011), American child rapist
Anne Carroll Moore (1871–1961), American educator, writer and advocate
Ernest Carroll Moore (1871–1955), American educator
James Carroll Napier (1845–1940), American politician, and civil rights leader
Raymond Carroll Osburn (1872–1955), American zoologist
J. Carroll Payne (1855—1936), American lawyer, banker, philanthropist, and patron of the arts
Vernon Carroll Porter (1896–1982), American artist
John Carroll Power (1819–1894), American historian
Brazilla Carroll Reece, known as B. Carroll Reece (1889–1961), American politician
James Carroll Robinson (1823–1886), American politician
Charles Carroll Simms (1824–1884), American and Confederate Naval officer
Charles Carroll Soule (1842–1913), American bookman
Henry Carroll Timmonds (1853–1913), American judge and state legislator
Washington Carroll Tevis (1829–1900), American mercenary
Myra Carroll Winkler (1880–1963), American educator and politician

See also

Caroll
Carrell (surname)
Carrol

Notes

English feminine given names
English masculine given names